Road to nowhere may  refer to:

Highways
Illinois Route 137, a section called the Amstutz Expressway in Waukegan, Illinois
Lakeview Drive, the uncompleted North Shore Road at Fontana Lake reservoir, Great Smoky Mountains National Park, North Carolina
Maryland Route 10 or the Arundel Expressway, Maryland
Schuylkill Parkway, a freeway stub in Bridgeport, Pennsylvania
U.S. Route 222, a section of freeway bypass north of Reading, Pennsylvania
the access road to a proposed Gravina Island Bridge in Alaska; the bridge was never built
a stretch of unused dual carriageway in Yate, England
Unused highway

Film and television
Road to Nowhere (film), a 2010 American thriller film
Max and Paddy's Road to Nowhere, a 2004 British comedy TV show

Songs
"Road to Nowhere", a song by Talking Heads
"Road to Nowhere", a song by Ozzy Osbourne from the album No More Tears
"Road to Nowhere", a song by Bullet for My Valentine on the deluxe edition of the album Scream Aim Fire
"Road to Nowhere", a song by Anthem on their album Immortal
"Road to Nowhere", a song by Lucie Idlout
"Road to Nowhere", a song by Nat King Cole on his album I Don't Want to Be Hurt Anymore
"A Road to Nowhere", a song by Gerry Goffin and Carole King, released as a single by King in 1966

Other uses
"The Road to Nowhere" (Дорога никуда), a 1930 novel by Alexander Grin
a neighborhood of Iqaluit, Nunavut, Canada

See also
Bridge to Nowhere (disambiguation)